Mauro Guevgeozián (born 10 May 1986) is a footballer who plays for Sport Boys. Born in Uruguay, he represents the Armenia national football team.

Club career
Born in Montevideo, Guevgeozián began his career in CA Fénix Montevideo where he became Cerrito scorer and the club became second division Uruguayan Segunda División Clausura champion. After a brief stay in Armenian football club Pyunik Yerevan, during which time the club won the 2007 Armenian Premier League, Guevgeozián returned to Fénix in 2008, where he established himself as a top goalscorer in the second division, which led to his arrival at Everton de Viña del Mar of Chile for the closing of the 2009 Chilean Primera División season tournament. Despite injury, he managed to qualify for the playoffs. In 2010, Guevgeozián was a key goalscorer, but he would go after he descended. He never committed to the team.

In 2011, he joined CA Peñarol Montevideo, with which won the vicechampionship in the 2011–12 Uruguayan Primera División season. Guevgeozián was the tenth top goalscorer with 7 goals. Despite that, he received very few minutes on court for this team. So, he again returned to Fénix in 2012 and again became an important scorer of the team, including scoring 3 goals in 2 games against Peñarol.

In January 2013, he was transferred to Club Libertad of Paraguay. Guevgeozián made his debut on 11 February 2013 in a draw match with Guaraní in the first round of the Paraguayan Primera División.

International career
Speculation that Guevgeozián would join the Armenia national team began in November 2012. Head coach Vardan Minasyan said during a television interview that he would invite him and Guevgeozián himself said he was pleasantly surprised and that it would be a great joy for him and his family if he were to play for the Armenian national football squad. He had not been contacted at the time, however.

Mauro Guevgeozián was supposed to join the Armenia national football team and debut in a match against Luxembourg on 5 February 2013. However, due to a disagreement between Guevgeozián and the Football Federation of Armenia over the travel class of his ticket, Mauro did not debut in the intended match.

Mauro would make his debut for Armenia on the friendly matches against Germany and Algeria, the week before the 2014 FIFA World Cup.

Personal life
Guevgeozián was born to Armenian parents in Uruguay. Although Peruvian fans nicknamed him differently, he is known as El Armenio among his teammates and at home. Guevgeozián is personally proud of his nickname.

Honours

Club
Pyunik Yerevan
Armenian Premier League: 2007

CA Peñarol Montevideo
Copa Libertadores runner-up: 2011

Alianza Lima
Copa Inca: 2014

References

External links
 
 

1986 births
Living people
Association football forwards
Armenian footballers
Armenian expatriate footballers
Armenia international footballers
Uruguayan footballers
Uruguayan expatriate footballers
Uruguayan people of Armenian descent
Citizens of Armenia through descent
FC Pyunik players
Sportivo Cerrito players
Peñarol players
Club Libertad footballers
Everton de Viña del Mar footballers
Club Alianza Lima footballers
Atlético Bucaramanga footballers
Newell's Old Boys footballers
Club Atlético Belgrano footballers
Club de Gimnasia y Esgrima La Plata footballers
Club Atlético Temperley footballers
Universidad Técnica de Cajamarca footballers
Uruguayan Primera División players
Chilean Primera División players
Argentine Primera División players
Armenian Premier League players
Paraguayan Primera División players
Peruvian Primera División players
Primera Nacional players
Expatriate footballers in Chile
Expatriate footballers in Argentina
Expatriate footballers in Paraguay
Expatriate footballers in Peru
Expatriate footballers in Colombia